The 2010 FIFA World Cup qualification UEFA Group 7 was a UEFA qualifying group for the 2010 FIFA World Cup. The group comprised France, Romania, Serbia, Lithuania, Austria and Faroe Islands.

The group was won by Serbia, who qualified for the 2010 FIFA World Cup. The runners-up France entered the UEFA play-off stage.

Standings

Matches
The representatives of the six federations met in Vienna, Austria on 8 December 2007 to decide on a fixture calendar. The August 2009 date in the international match calendar was moved forward by one week, from 19 August to 12 August, at the FIFA Executive Committee meeting in May 2008.

Goalscorers
There were 81 goals scored during the 30 games, an average of 2.7 goals per game.

6 goals
 Marc Janko

5 goals
 Milan Jovanović

4 goals
 André-Pierre Gignac
 Thierry Henry
 Tomas Danilevičius

3 goals
 Franck Ribéry
 Marius Stankevičius
 Branislav Ivanović
 Nikola Žigić

2 goals

 Erwin Hoffer
 Nicolas Anelka
 Karim Benzema
 Mindaugas Kalonas
 Gheorghe Bucur
 Ciprian Marica
 Miloš Krasić
 Nenad Milijaš

1 goal

 René Aufhauser
 Andreas Ivanschitz
 Stefan Maierhofer
 Franz Schiemer
 Martin Stranzl
 Roman Wallner
 Egil á Bø
 Arnbjørn Hansen
 Bogi Løkin
 Andreas Lava Olsen
 Suni Olsen
 William Gallas
 Sidney Govou
 Yoann Gourcuff
 Saulius Mikoliūnas
 Iulian Apostol
 Răzvan Cociş
 Dorin Goian
 Ionuţ Mazilu
 Florentin Petre
 Dorel Stoica
 Cristian Tănase
 Zdravko Kuzmanović
 Ivan Obradović
 Marko Pantelić
 Neven Subotić
 Zoran Tošić

1 own goal
 Jón Rói Jacobsen (playing against Serbia)
 Julien Escudé (playing against Romania)
 Dorel Stoica (playing against Serbia)

Attendances

References

7
2008–09 in French football
qual
2008–09 in Austrian football
2009–10 in Austrian football
2008–09 in Serbian football
qual
2008–09 in Romanian football
2009–10 in Romanian football
2009 in Lithuanian football
2008 in Lithuanian football
2009 in Faroe Islands football
2008 in Faroe Islands football